The Indian scops owl (Otus bakkamoena) is a species of owl native to South Asia.

Taxonomy and etymology
This species formerly included the collared scops owl (Otus lettia). The species epithet is derived from "bakamuna", the Sinhalese name for the white barn owl (Tyto alba), and the brown fish owl (Ketupa zeylonensis).

Description
The Indian scops owl is a small  owl, although it is one of the largest of the scops owls. Like other scops owls, it has small head tufts, or ears. The upperparts are grey or brown, depending on the morph, with faint buff spotting. The underparts are buff with fine darker streaking. The facial disc is whitish or buff, and the eyes are orange or brown. There is a buff neckband. Sexes are similar. The flight is deeply undulating.

This species is very similar to the slightly larger partially migratory collared scops owl (Otus lettia) and the oriental scops owl (Otus sunia). They can be separated on call and eye colour.

Distribution and habitat
The species occurs from eastern Arabia through the Indian Subcontinent, except the far north.

Ecology
The Indian scops owl is nocturnal. Through its natural camouflage, it is very difficult to see in daytime, but may sometimes be located by the small birds that mob it while it is roosting in a tree. It feeds mainly on insects. The call is a soft single note ("whuk?"). It nests in tree holes, laying 3–5 eggs.

References 

Indian scops owl
Birds of South Asia
Indian scops owl
Indian scops owl
Taxa named by Thomas Pennant